Jacques Caufrier (15 February 1942 – 2 August 2012) was a Belgian male water polo player. He was a member of the Belgium men's national water polo team. He competed with the team at the 1960 Summer Olympics and the 1964 Summer Olympics.

References

External links
 

1942 births
2012 deaths
Belgian male water polo players
Water polo players at the 1960 Summer Olympics
Water polo players at the 1964 Summer Olympics
Olympic water polo players of Belgium
People from Merelbeke
Place of death missing
Sportspeople from East Flanders